Calosoma imbricatum is a species of ground beetle in the subfamily of Carabinae. It was described by Johann Christoph Friedrich Klug in 1832.

References

imbricatum
Beetles described in 1832